The Anatolian Journal of Cardiology is a peer-reviewed medical journal that covers all aspects of cardiology. It was established in 2001 and the editor-in-chief is Çetin Erol (Ankara University).

Abstracting and indexing 
The journal is abstracted and indexed in:
 Index Medicus/MEDLINE/PubMed
 Scopus
 EMBASE
 Science Citation Index Expanded
 CINAHL
According to the Journal Citation Reports, the journal has a 2020 impact factor of 1.596.

References

External links 
 

Cardiology journals
Publications established in 2001
Open access journals
Multilingual journals
8 times per year journals